Sails is the fifty-fourth studio album by Chet Atkins. It was released in 1987 by Columbia Records. Sails follows in the 1980s' vein of Chet Atkins' releases with a smooth jazz and new age atmosphere.

Reception

Allmusic music critic Richard S. Ginell wrote of the album; "this recording veers well across the line into new age wallowing of the most innocuous kind... this is not one of the better Atkins Columbia discs."

Track listing
 "Sails" (Hall) – 4:20
 "Why Worry" (Mark Knopfler) – 6:23
 "Sometime, Someplace" (David Hungate, Randy McCormick) – 4:59
 "Up in My Treehouse" (Walker) – 3:52
 "Waltz for the Lonely" (Chet Atkins, Randy Goodrum) – 3:01
 "Laffin' at Life" (Atkins, Daryyl Dybka, David Hungate) – 5:30
 "On a Roll" (Atkins, Dybka, Paul Yandell) – 5:21
 "My Song" (Keith Jarrett) – 5:08
 "Love Letters" (Dybka) – 3:09
 "Wobegon (The Way It Used to Be)" (Atkins) – 3:20

Personnel
Chet Atkins - guitar, banjo
Darryl Dybka - keyboards
David Hungate - bass
Earl Klugh - guitar
Mark Knopfler - guitar
Mike Lawler - keyboards
Clayton Ivey - keyboards
Randy McCormick - keyboards
Billy Joe Walker, Jr. - guitar
Terry McMillan - harmonica, percussion
Paul Yandell - guitar
Millard Green - guitar
Larrie Londin - drums, percussion
Mark Hammond - percussion, drum programming
Bob Mater - drums
Jim Horn - horns
Mike Haynes - horns
Baba Ram Dave - sitar
Aristotle Onassid - bouzouki
Dave Humphries - drum programming

Production notes
Strings arranged by Bergen White
Horns arranged by Bergen White and Darryl Dybka
Mixed by Dave Palmer and John Mills
Engineered by John Mills and Tom Singers
Mastered by Denny Purcell
Design by Bill Johnson and Jeff Morris

References

1987 albums
Chet Atkins albums
Albums produced by Chet Atkins
Columbia Records albums